Lak Si Station is a railway station in the area of Bangkok's Lak Si district. It serves the SRT Dark Red Line.

History 
Lak Si station opened in 1898 as part of Thailand's first railway between Bangkok and Ayutthaya. The original station structure was demolished in 1990 during the construction of the failed Hopewell BERTS project. 

The new elevated station opened on 2 August 2021. The ground-level station closed on 19 January 2023 and long-distance trains on the Northern and Northeastern lines stopped operating from the ground-level station entirely.

Gallery

References

Railway stations in Thailand